Barkeria lindleyana is a species of orchid.

References

External links

lindleyana
Plants described in 1842